"The Man Who Loved Flowers" is a short story by Stephen King, first published in the August 1977 issue of Gallery, and later collected in King's 1978 collection Night Shift. The story revolves around a young man who buys flowers for his love interest, but he is eventually revealed to be a serial killer who went insane after his lover's supposed death.

Plot summary
In New York City, during an early evening in May 1963, an unnamed man walks up 3rd Avenue. The sky is just changing color from light blue to violet. The man is wearing a light gray suit. He looks like he is in love. The people around him all seem to perceive and respond to this feeling. He passes an electronics store with a color television on sale; it broadcasts a Mets game. 

The man stops at a flower vendor. A transistor radio drones about a war brewing in Vietnam and about a woman's body that was found in the local river and a hammer murderer that was on the loose. The man is buying flowers for a girl named Norma. He eyes the cheaper flowers, saying Norma does not like big spenders. The old man selling flowers promotes the more expensive tea roses, saying, "No woman who gets flowers ever turns into an accountant."

This convinces the young man to buy a half dozen tea roses. He continues up the street, and the people on the street continue to respond to him and the lovestruck look on his face.

He then turns into an alley. By now it is getting darker. Night starts to fall.  He is on his way to meet Norma. He sees a woman walking down the alleyway, and he rushes to her. He calls her name, and she looks around. 

He says, "I've bought some flowers for you, Norma."

The woman replies, "You must be mistaken, my name is-"

She sees a hammer in his pocket and opens her mouth to scream. The man kills the woman because she isn't Norma, just as he has done five times previously. He leaves the alleyway.  "Norma" has been dead for ten years, and the grief drove the man insane. The young man says that his name is Love. He feels optimistic, sure that he will find Norma soon.

He passes a middle-aged couple on the street. The woman turns to her partner and asks, "Why don't you ever look like that anymore?" while thinking that "if there is anything more beautiful than springtime, it's young love".

Film adaptation
"The Man Who Loved Flowers" was adapted in 2015 as a short film by Bricker-Down Productions.

There is a music videoclip called "Literatura rusa" by Jose Madero, that is based on "The man who loved flowers"

See also
 Stephen King short fiction bibliography

References

1977 short stories
Fictional serial killers
Horror short stories
Short stories adapted into films
Short stories by Stephen King
Short stories set in New York City
Works originally published in Gallery (magazine)